Wet Bed Gang is a Portuguese rap and hip hop tuga group from Vialonga. The group was formed in 2014 by João "La Bella Mafia" Rossi and Pizzy. The group consists of four Portuguese singers and rappers with the stage names Gson, Zara G, Kroa and Zizzy Jr. The group received national recognition after their songs gained millions of plays on YouTube and Spotify.

Career 
The group was co-founded by João "La Bella Mafia" Rossi and Pizzy in 2014. Following Rossi's death, the remaining members chose to continue with the development of the musical group. Their first extended play, called "Filhos do Rossi", or "Sons of Rossi" in English, was a tribute to the group's co-founder.

In August 2019, they performed at the Meo Sudoeste music festival.

Members

Current

Awards

Discography

EPs

Singles

As featured artists

With Zara G as lead artist

With Gson as lead artist

References

External links 
 

Portuguese musical groups
Portuguese rappers
Portuguese male singer-songwriters
21st-century Portuguese male singers
People from Vila Franca de Xira